Boofzheim is a commune in the Bas-Rhin department in Grand Est in north-eastern France. Its name is probably derived from the French "bœuf" (bull or ox). Variants of the name include Boofi - Boffesheim - Bofftsheim - Boffsheim - Bototzheim - Booftzheim - Booffzheim.

History

It is said that from the fifteenth century the village belonged to the Mieg family. In 1545, they introduced the Protestant Reformation into the village and the village church of St Etienne was turned into a Protestant chapel.

According to another source, Sebastian Mieg (Mueg), from a Strasbourg merchant family, bought half of Boofzheim in 1567 from the Abbess of St Etienne and built a castle on the land. This castle was burnt down by the Swedes in 1636 and was rebuilt in 1642. It was to the east of the Catholic Church, but no trace remains today. Église Saint-Étienne de Boofzheim was last built in 1684.

From 1687 to 1854, the Church was shared by Protestants and Catholics, after which the Protestants built their own church and St Etienne's was given back to the Catholics.
In 1852, there were 953 Protestants and 200 Catholics in the village.

See also
 Communes of the Bas-Rhin department

References

Communes of Bas-Rhin
Bas-Rhin communes articles needing translation from French Wikipedia